The Faith Brown Chat Show was a short-lived comedy series featuring the British impressionist and singer, Faith Brown. Broadcast in the
United Kingdom in 1980, the series was a mix of songs and celebrity impressions. Only 6 episodes were produced
.

Background and Development

The series was commissioned by Michael Grade, Director of Programmes at LWT, following the success of the one-off special,
The Faith Brown Awards, which had attracted an audience of 9.8 million viewers when it was broadcast in 1978
.

References

External links
.

1980 British television series debuts
1980 British television series endings
ITV comedy
London Weekend Television shows
Television series by ITV Studios